Edward P. Brown was a 19th-century professional baseball player.  Brown played primarily third base and outfield for the St. Louis Brown Stockings in 1882 and the Toledo Blue Stockings in 1884.

External links

19th-century baseball players
Major League Baseball outfielders
Major League Baseball third basemen
St. Louis Brown Stockings (AA) players
Toledo Blue Stockings players
St. Paul Apostles players
Stillwater (minor league baseball) players
Year of birth unknown
Year of death unknown
Baseball players from Chicago